Leckmelm is a small settlement on the eastern shore of Loch Broom, in Wester Ross in the Highland council area of Scotland.

The Battle of Leckmelm took place in the area in 1586. In the 1870s Leckmelm was extensively cleared during the Highland Clearances (the "eviction of the Gaels") consequently the eviction of tenants at Leckmelm was examined in the proceedings of the Napier Commission

References

Populated places in Ross and Cromarty